"Nights in Harlem" is a song by American recording artist Luther Vandross, released July 14, 1998. It was written by Vandross along with Fonzi Thornton and Rex Rideout for his eleventh studio album I Know (1998). The uptempo song served as the album's lead single. Following its release, it peaked number 4 on Billboards Adult R&B Songs.

A "Darkchild remix" version appears as the final track on I Know; it features uncredited background vocals by Brandy and is remixed by her frequent collaborator, Rodney Jerkins.

Critical reception
Larry Flick of Billboard wrote, "Vandross christens his new alliance with Virgin with a lively jam that firmly reminds programmers how cool soul music is really made. Seamlessly produced by the artist, "Nights In Harlem" chugs with an old-school, funk juiced flavor that takes the listener back to the days when music was made, not sampled. A rap cameo by Precise keeps "Nights In Harlem" on a jeep-smart path, though this track hardly needs it. The combo platter of blissfully nostalgic lyrics and a top-form performance from Vandross is enough to render this an instant R&B radio smash. Popsters should pay close attention, too. After all, no one can live solely on kiddie pop."

Track listing
US CD Single (Promo)
"Nights In Harlem" feat. Precise (LP Edit)
"Nights In Harlem" feat. Guru (A Darkchild Remix Edit)
"Nights In Harlem" (LP Edit W/O Rap)	
"Nights In Harlem" (A Darkchild Remix Edit W/O Rap)	
"Nights In Harlem" feat. Guru (A Darkchild Extended Remix)
UK Vinyl 12" Single
A1 "Nights In Harlem" (Darkchild Extended Remix)-5:25
A2 "Nights In Harlem" (Darkchild Remix Edit)-4:09
B1 "Nights In Harlem" (Darkchild Instrumental)-4:23
B2 "Nights In Harlem" (LP Edit)-4:36

Charts

References

1998 songs
Luther Vandross songs
1998 singles
Songs written by Luther Vandross
Virgin Records singles